Raymond Arthur Flanigan (January 8, 1923 – March 28, 1993) was an American professional baseball player, a right-handed pitcher  who appeared in three games in Major League Baseball for the Cleveland Indians at the tail end of the 1946 season.

Flanigan's minor league career began in 1941, but he missed the 1943–1945 seasons while serving in the European Theater of Operations with the United States Army during World War II.  His Major League trial came after he won 13 of 27 decisions for the 1946 Baltimore Orioles of the Triple-A International League. His three MLB appearances all came against the Detroit Tigers — two as a relief pitcher and one as a starter. His second MLB game was his most successful, as he surrendered only one hit and one unearned run in 3 innings in relief of Steve Gromek as the Indians fell, 4–3, on September 22 at Cleveland Stadium.

Altogether, Flanagan gave up 11 hits and 11 earned runs in nine total innings pitched in the Majors, with two strikeouts and eight bases on balls.  He retired from pitching in 1949.

References

External links

1923 births
1993 deaths
Baltimore Orioles (IL) players
Baseball players from West Virginia
Cleveland Indians players
Major League Baseball pitchers
Oklahoma City Indians players
United States Army personnel of World War II